At War with Love is a 2016 Italian comedy film directed by Pif.

Cast 
 Pif as Arturo Giammarresi
 Miriam Leone as Flora Guarneri
 Andrea Di Stefano as Philip Catelli
 Stella Egitto as Teresa
 Vincent Riotta as James Maone
 Maurizio Marchetti as Don Calò
 Mario Pupella as  Don Tano
 Aurora Quattrocchi as Annina

References

External links 

2016 comedy-drama films
Italian comedy-drama films
Italian Campaign of World War II films
Mafia films
War romance films
Films set in Sicily
Films set in New York City
Films set in 1943
2010s Italian films
2010s Italian-language films